Lenny Harbinson is a Gaelic football manager and former player. He managed his native Antrim between 2017 and 2020.

He played for St Gall's and Antrim and leads a sales team.

Appointed Antrim senior manager in late 2017, he was unable to gain promotion from Division 4 of the National Football League and the county exited the Ulster Senior Football Championship in its first game in each of his three years, though defeated Louth in an away All-Ireland Senior Football Championship qualifier in 2019. Harbinson previously led St Gall's to the 2009–10 All-Ireland Senior Club Football Championship.

References

Living people
All-Ireland Senior Club Football Championship winning managers
Antrim inter-county Gaelic footballers
Gaelic football managers
St Gall's Gaelic footballers
Year of birth missing (living people)